The 1961 NCAA University Division Cross Country Championships were the 23rd annual cross country meet to determine the team and individual national champions of men's collegiate cross country running in the United States. Held on November 27, 1961, the meet was hosted by Michigan State University at the Forest Akers East Golf Course in East Lansing, Michigan. The distance for the race was 4 miles (6.4 kilometers). 

All NCAA University Division members were eligible to qualify for the meet. In total, 17 teams and 134 individual runners contested this championship.

The team national championship was won by the Oregon State Beavers, their first. The individual championship was won by Dale Story, also from Oregon State, with a time of 19:46.84.

Men's title
Distance: 4 miles (6.4 kilometers)

Team Result (Top 10)

See also
NCAA Men's College Division Cross Country Championship

References
 

NCAA Cross Country Championships
NCAA University Division Cross Country Championships
NCAA University Division Cross Country Championships
NCAA University Division Cross Country Championships
Sports competitions in East Lansing, Michigan
Track and field in Michigan
Michigan State University